Albert James Campbell (December 12, 1857 – August 9, 1907) was a U.S. Representative from Montana.

Born in Pontiac, Michigan, Campbell attended the common schools and the State Agricultural College,  Lansing (now Michigan State University).  He taught school for several years, and then studied law.  He was admitted to the bar in 1881 and commenced practice in Oxford, Michigan.  He moved to Clarke, Michigan, in 1882, and resumed the practice of law.  He served as prosecuting attorney of Lake County, Michigan, from 1886 to 1888 when he resigned.  He moved to Butte, Montana, on November 16, 1889, and continued the practice of his profession.  He served as member of the Montana House of Representatives in 1897.

Campbell was elected as a Democrat to the Fifty-sixth Congress (March 4, 1899 – March 3, 1901).  He declined to be a candidate for renomination in 1900.  He resumed the practice of law in Butte, Montana.  He died in New York City, August 9, 1907.  He was interred in Mount Moriah Cemetery, Butte, Montana.

References 

1857 births
1907 deaths
Michigan State University alumni
Politicians from Pontiac, Michigan
Democratic Party members of the Montana House of Representatives
American prosecutors
Montana lawyers
Democratic Party members of the United States House of Representatives from Montana
19th-century American politicians
Politicians from Butte, Montana
People from Lake County, Michigan
Burials in Montana